Glinishchi is a rural locality (a village) in Paustovskoye Rural Settlement, Vyaznikovsky District, Vladimir Oblast, Russia. The population was 72 as of 2010. There are 2 streets.

Geography 
Glinishchi is located 25 km southeast of Vyazniki (the district's administrative centre) by road. Kamenevo is the nearest rural locality.

References 

Rural localities in Vyaznikovsky District